KPFC (91.9 FM) is a radio station broadcasting a Variety format. Licensed to Callisburg, Texas, United States, the station serves the Cooke County area.  The station is currently owned by Camp Sweeney.
KPFC also has a translator transmitter (K206CD) on 89.1.  91.9 and 89.1 serve Cooke County and the surrounding areas with an eclectic mix of music and programming.  The program director is Suede Wanamaker. During sessions at Camp Sweeney, campers are allowed to go on air with Chad and do their own segments during the first 2 periods in the morning.

Fun Facts

· When a camper on air has been given the "Camper Of the Day" reward, they receive an 89.1 KPFC-FM sticker.

· During Flag Lowering, and some night time activities (Such as campfires and the Talent Show), regular broadcasting is replaced by an audio stream from said event

References

External links

PFC